Renanthera, abbreviated as Ren in horticultural trade, is a genus of large scrambling monopodial epiphytic and terrestrial species of orchid found in China, the Himalayas, Southeast Asia, New Guinea, and Melanesia.

Species in this genus produce a branched inflorescence containing numerous flowers ranging in color from yellow and orange to red. These flowers possess large lateral sepals.

Cultivation 
Species in this genus usually require an intermediate to hot climate with good air movement and generally bright light. Their scrambling style of growth means they are best grown on a hanging mount or basket. If they are grown in pots there must be excellent drainage.

References

External links 
 
 

 
Vandeae genera